Lake Guri may refer to:

 Lake Guri in Madang Province of Papua New Guinea
 Lake created by Guri Dam on the Caroni River in Venezuela